An espagnolette is a locking device, normally mounted on the vertical frame of a French door or casement window. A handle or knob is connected to a metal rod mounted to the surface of the frame, about a metre above the floor. Operating the handle rotates the rod, which has hooks at each end that fit into sockets at the head and sill of the opening. This type of lock is often used on semi-trailer trucks to fasten the rear doors. It can be identified by the use of a round bar, instead of a half-round bar used on a crémone bolt.

In the photograph, the decorative lever arm (1) is hinged to rotate 90 degrees out of a metal "keeper" bracket (2), and then pull away from the surface of the door, which rotates the round metal rod (3), and also the hook at the bottom of the rod to unfasten the mechanism from the metal "stop" (4) mounted on the floor and unfasten the door leaf. The rod, hook and stop at the top door head are not pictured. The door leaf swings outward, and this kind of stop presents a tripping hazard when used at a door sill.

References

Windows